The Oxford and Cambridge Act 1571 (13 Eliz 1 c 29) is an Act of the Parliament of England.

This main purpose of this act was to incorporate the Universities of Oxford and Cambridge.  The Act was partly in force in Great Britain at the end of 2010.

So much of this Act as imposed upon the mayor, aldermen, and citizens of the City of Oxford, or any of them, or any Municipal Officer of the City of Oxford, the obligation of taking any oath for the conservation of the liberties and privileges of the University of Oxford was repealed and annulled and made void by section 1 of the Universities of Oxford and Cambridge Act 1859.

References
Halsbury's Statutes,

External links
The Oxford and Cambridge Act 1571, as amended, from Legislation.gov.uk.

Acts of the Parliament of England (1485–1603)
History of the University of Cambridge
History of the University of Oxford
1571 in law
1571 in England
16th century in Cambridgeshire
16th century in Oxfordshire
University-related legislation